Paradrillia darnleyensis is a species of sea snail, a marine gastropod mollusk in the family Horaiclavidae.

Description

Distribution
This marine species is endemic to Australia and occurs off Queensland.

References

 Shuto, T. 1983. New turrid taxa from the Australian waters. Memoirs of the Faculty of Sciences of Kyushu University, Series D, Geology 25: 1–26

External links
  Tucker, J.K. 2004 Catalog of recent and fossil turrids (Mollusca: Gastropoda). Zootaxa 682:1–1295.
 Biolib.cz: Image of a shell of Paradrillia darnleyensis

darnleyensis
Gastropods described in 1983
Gastropods of Australia